The 1974 Rutgers Scarlet Knights football team represented Rutgers University in the 1974 NCAA Division I football season. In their second season under head coach Frank R. Burns, the Scarlet Knights compiled a 7–3–1 record. Rutgers outscored opponents 244 to 146. The team's statistical leaders included Bret Kosup with 1,070 passing yards, Curt Edwards with 889 rushing yards, and Mark Twitty with 314 receiving yards.

The Scarlet Knights played their home games at Rutgers Stadium in Piscataway, New Jersey, across the river from the university's main campus in New Brunswick, New Jersey.

Schedule

References

Rutgers
Rutgers Scarlet Knights football seasons
Rutgers Scarlet Knights football